Shubert is a surname. Notable people with the surname include:

The Shubert family who were prominent in American theatre and founded the Shubert Organization, including:
Lee Shubert (1871–1953)
Sam S. Shubert (1878–1905)
Jacob J. Shubert (1879–1963)
Shubert Theatre, a Broadway theatre in New York City
Fern Shubert, American politician
Jimmy Shubert, stand-up comedian

See also
Schubert (disambiguation)
Shubert (disambiguation)

Jewish surnames
Occupational surnames